The Australian and New Zealand Wine Industry Journal published a wide range of articles from technical and scientific papers to practical advice and the latest news on research and development. The journal was issued six times a year and featured practical winemaking, practical grape growing, articles on wine regions and wine styles, vintage reports, marketing, finance and management, research papers, and industry news and analyses. In 2010 the magazine merged with Australian Viticulture to form a new wine magazine, Wine & Viticulture Journal.

See also
Australian wine
New Zealand wine

References

1986 establishments in Australia
2010 disestablishments in Australia
Australian wine
Bi-monthly magazines published in Australia
Business magazines published in Australia
Defunct magazines published in Australia
English-language magazines
Magazines established in 1986
Magazines disestablished in 2010
New Zealand wine
Professional and trade magazines
Wine magazines
Mass media in Adelaide